Below is the list of rectors of the Ankara University in Turkey. The first rector  was Şevket Aziz Kansu. The incumbent rector is Erkan İbiş.

References

 
Ankara University